Pelosi is an Italian surname meaning 'hairy' (masculine plural).

As a surname, Pelosi may refer to the following people:

 Alexandra Pelosi (born 1970), American journalist, documentary filmmaker, writer, and daughter of Nancy Pelosi
 Christine Pelosi (born 1966), American political strategist and daughter of Nancy Pelosi
 Claudio Pelosi (born 1966), Italian football striker
 Daniel Pelosi (born 1963), American convicted murderer
 John Pelosi (born 1956), Scottish football right winger
 Marc Pelosi (born 1994), American soccer midfielder
 Nancy Pelosi (born 1940), the 52nd speaker of the United States House of Representatives
 Paul Pelosi (born 1940), American businessman, sports executive, and husband of Nancy Pelosi
 Roberta Pelosi (born 1960), Italian sport shooter
 Ron Pelosi (born 1934), American politician and brother-in-law to Nancy Pelosi
 Salvatore Pelosi (1906–1974), Italian Naval officer who fought in World War II

Italian-language surnames